Proximal Policy Optimization (PPO) is a family of model-free reinforcement learning algorithms developed at OpenAI in 2017. PPO algorithms are policy gradient methods, which means that they search the space of policies rather than assigning values to state-action pairs.

PPO algorithms have some of the benefits of trust region policy optimization (TRPO) algorithms, but they are simpler to implement, more general, and have better sample complexity. It is done by using a different objective function.

See also 
 Reinforcement learning
 Temporal difference learning
 Game theory

References

External links 
 Announcement of Proximal Policy Optimization by OpenAI
 GitHub repo

Machine learning algorithms
Reinforcement learning